The 1999–2000 season was the 76th season in the existence of CF Extremadura and the club's first season back in the second division of Spanish football. The season covered the period from 1 July 1999 to 30 June 2000.

Competitions

Overall record

La Liga

League table

Results summary

Results by round

Matches

Source:

Copa del Rey

First round

References

CF Extremadura seasons
Extremadura